Blepharomastix mononalis is a moth in the family Crambidae. It was described by Harrison Gray Dyar Jr. in 1918. It is found in Chiapas, Mexico.

The wingspan is about 17 mm. The forewings are pale straw colour, but darker at the tip. The costa is brown powdered up to two-thirds and there is a dot on the median vein at the base and on the internal margin. There is also a dot below on the submedian fold and there is a black dot on the costa at four-fifths, from which a straight brown line runs to the anal angle. The terminal line is dark brown. The hindwings have a nearly straight line from the discal dot to the tornus. The outer line runs from the costa at three-fourths to the discal fold.

References

Moths described in 1918
Blepharomastix